Enda Colleran (May 1942 – 8 April 2004) was an Irish Gaelic footballer and manager who played for the Mountbellew–Moylough club and at senior level for the Galway county team.

Career
A native of Moylough, Colleran's Gaelic football prowess was first noticed on the national stage in 1960 when he won an All-Ireland Minor Championship medal with Galway and a Hogan Cup medal with St Jarlath's College. Having made his Galway senior debut in 1961, he went on to play in four successive All-Ireland senior finals between 1963 and 1966, winning the latter three against Kerry (twice) and Meath. Colleran also picked up two Sigerson Cup medals with University College Galway and became only the fourth Connacht man to captain his province to Railway Cup success when they beat Ulster in the 1967 final.

A brief spell as a rugby union player with Corinthians was followed by Colleran taking over as manager of the Galway senior team, winning a Connacht Championship title in 1976. His next high-profile engagement was as analyst on the Sunday Game. Colleran was also named on the Team of the Century and Team of the Millennium.

Personal life and death
Colleran worked as a secondary school teacher at St Enda's College in Salthill. He died suddenly at his home in Barna, County Galway on 8 April 2004.

Honours
St Jarlath's College
All-Ireland Colleges Senior Football Championship: 1960
Connacht Colleges Senior Football Championship: 1960

University College Galway
Sigerson Cup: 1963, 1964

Mountbellew–Moylough
Galway Senior Football Championship: 1964, 1965

Galway Corinthians
Connacht Senior Cup: 1971–72

Galway
All-Ireland Senior Football Championship: 1964, 1965, 1966
Connacht Senior Football Championship: 1963, 1964, 1965, 1966, 1968, 1970
National Football League: 1964–65
All-Ireland Minor Football Championship: 1960
Connacht Minor Football Championship: 1960

Connacht
Railway Cup: 1967

References

1942 births
2004 deaths
All-Ireland-winning captains (football)
Alumni of the University of Galway
Connacht inter-provincial Gaelic footballers
Gaelic footballers who switched code
Gaelic football managers
Gaelic football selectors
Gaelic games writers and broadcasters
Galway inter-county Gaelic footballers
Irish schoolteachers
Mountbellew–Moylough Gaelic footballers
University of Galway Gaelic footballers
People educated at St Jarlath's College